Song of Surrender is a 1949 drama film directed by Mitchell Leisen and starring Wanda Hendrix and Claude Rains.

Plot

Cast
Wanda Hendrix as Abigail Hunt
Claude Rains as Elisha Hunt
Macdonald Carey as Bruce Eldridge
Andrea King as Phyllis Cantwell
Henry Hull as Deacon Perry
Gordon Richards as Clayton
Ray Walker as Auctioneer

References

External links

1949 films
American black-and-white films
Films scored by Victor Young
Films directed by Mitchell Leisen
Paramount Pictures films
Films set in New England
Films set in the 1900s
American historical drama films
1940s historical drama films
1949 drama films
1940s English-language films
1940s American films